Hinemoa is a genus of small sea snails, pyramidellid gastropod mollusks. This genus is currently placed in the subfamily Chrysallidinae, within the family Pyramidellidae.

Shell description
The original description of the genus is short and states that the shells are ovate with a one-whorled protoconch. The aperture is ovate and the columella has a feeble plait. The sculpture consists of  spiral ribs only.

The original description of the type species is also rather short and states that the shell is ovate with an obtuse apex and 4½ whorls. The aperture broadly ovate and the outer lip is thin. The inner lip is raised anteriorly with a slight umbilical chink between it and the body-whorl. The columella-plait small and oblique. The  protoconch of one whorl that is smooth and polished. The distance between the ribs are equal to their with, and equal to the distance between those on each side of the suture. The suture is not distinguishable. It has 3 additional low spiral ribs on the base. The surface is otherwise rather smooth. The color of the protoconch is ruby-red and shining and the shell is light pink. Within the aperture it is  whitish. The height 1.1 mm. and the diameter 0.6 mm.

Life habits
Little is known about the biology of the members of this genus. As is true of most members of the Pyramidellidae sensu lato, they are most likely ectoparasites.

The ultrastructure of the sperm has been investigated by Healy (1988).

Species
Species within the genus Hinemoa include:
 Hinemoa crassella van Aartsen & Corgan, 1996
 Hinemoa duplex Laseron, 1959
 Hinemoa forticingulata Bozzetti, 2008
 Hinemoa gumia (Hedley, 1909)
 Hinemoa indica (Melvill, 1896)
 Hinemoa isseli (Tryon, 1886)
 Hinemoa laquearia (Hedley, 1909)
 Hinemoa laxefuniculata Robba, Di Geronimo, Chaimanee, Negri & Sanfilippo, 2004
  Hinemoa leviplex Laseron, 1959
 Hinemoa ligata (Angas, 1877)
 Hinemoa punicea Oliver, 1915 - type species
 Hinemoa sternerea Laseron, 1959
Species brought into synonymy
 Hinemoa cylindrica (de Folin, 1879): synonym of Oscilla galilae Bogi, Karhan & Yokeş, 2012
 Hinemoa rubra Laseron, 1959: synonym of Hinemoa ligata (Angas, 1877)
 Hinemoa voorwindei Laseron, 1959: synonym of Oscilla voorwindei (Laseron, 1959)

References

External links 
 Hinemoa cylindrica description

Pyramidellidae